Septaria is a genus of freshwater and brackish water snails, gastropod mollusks in the family Neritidae. 

These superficially limpet-like snails are native to the Indo-Pacific region. Most species are found in rivers and streams, mainly fast-flowing, but two (S. livida and S. tesselata; sometimes in their own subgenus Navicella) live in brackish coastal waters and the lower tidal section of rivers and streams. Their eggs are attached to hard surfaces such as stones. After hatching, many veligers avoid being swept away by the current by swimming close to the bottom, but it is speculated that some flow downstream into the sea only to return to freshwater later.

Species
Species within the genus Septaria include:
 Septaria apiata (Le Guillou in Récluz, 1841)
 Septaria bougainvillei (Récluz, 1841)
 Septaria clypeolum (Récluz, 1843)
 Septaria cumingiana (Récluz, 1842)
 Septaria freycineti Récluz, 1842
 Septaria janelli (Récluz, 1841)
 Septaria lineata (Lamarck, 1816)
 Septaria livida (Reeve, 1856)
 Septaria luzonica (Souleyet in Récluz, 1842)
 Septaria macrocephala (Le Guillou in Récluz, 1841)
 Septaria porcellana (Linnaeus, 1758)
 Septaria sanguisuga (Reeve, 1856)
 Septaria sculpta (E. von Martens, 1881)
 Septaria tahitiana Eichhorst, 2016
 Septaria tessellata (Lamarck, 1816)
 Septaria tessellaria (Lamarck, 1816)
 

Several additional species have been described, but are now considered synonyms. 
Species brought into synonymy include
 Septaria borbonica (Saint-Vincent, 1803) - type species: synonym of Septaria porcellana borbonica (Bory de Saint-Vincent, 1804)
 Septaria haustrum (Reeve, 1856): synonym of Septaria porcellana borbonica (Bory de Saint-Vincent, 1804)
 Septaria suborbicularis (G. B. Sowerby I, 1825): synonym of Septaria porcellana (Linnaeus, 1758)
 Septaria suffreni (Récluz, 1841): synonym of Septaria freycineti Récluz, 1842
 Septaria taitana Mousson, 1869: synonym of Septaria tahitiana Eichhorst, 2016 (unavailable name: nomen nudum)

References

 Eichhorst T.E. (2016). Neritidae of the world. Volume 2. Harxheim: Conchbooks. Pp. 696-1366

External links
 Férussac, J. B. L. d'Audebard de & A. E. J. P. F. d'Audebard de Férussac. (1807). Essai d'une méthode conchyliologique Appliquée aux Mollusques fluviatiles et terrestres d'après la considération de l'animal et de son Test. Nouvelle édition augmentée d'une synonymie des espèces les plus remarquables, d'une table de concordance systématique de celles qui ont été décrites par Géoffroy, Poiret et Draparnaud, avec Müller et Linné, et terminée par un catalogue d'espèces observées en divers lieux de la France. Delance, Paris. xvi + 142 pp.
  Lamarck, J. B. P. A. de M. de. (1816). Tableau encyclopédique et méthodique des trois règnes de la nature, Mollusques et polypes divers. Part 23
 Montfort P. (Denys de). (1808-1810). Conchyliologie systématique et classification méthodique des coquilles. Paris: Schoell. Vol. 1: pp. lxxxvii + 409 [1808. Vol. 2: pp. 676 + 16 ]
 Schumacher, C. F. (1817). Essai d'un nouveau système des habitations des vers testacés. Schultz, Copenghagen. iv + 288 pp., 22 pls
 Adams, H. & Adams, A. (1853-1858). The genera of Recent Mollusca; arranged according to their organization. London, van Voorst. Vol. 1: xl + 484 pp.; vol. 2: 661 pp.; vol. 3: 138 pls.
 Gray, J. E. (1847). A list of the genera of recent Mollusca, their synonyma and types. Proceedings of the Zoological Society of London. (1847) 15: 129-219.
 Gray, J. E. (1868). Notes on Catillus, Humphrey, or Navicella, Lamarck, with descriptions of two new genera. Proceedings of the Zoological Society of London. 1867: 993-1000
 Dall, W. H. (1900). Some names which must be discarded. The Nautilus. 14(4): 44–45.
 Haynes, A. (2001). A revision of the genus Septaria Férussac, 1803 (Gastropoda: Neritimorpha). Annalen des Naturhistorischen Museums in Wien. Serie B für Botanik und Zoologie. 103: 177-229

Neritidae